Nerone (Nero) is an opera in three acts by Pietro Mascagni from a libretto by Giovanni Targioni-Tozzetti, based on the 1872 play Nerone by Pietro Cossa. Most of Mascagni's music was drawn from a failed project Vistilia (from 1907) – the music made to 'fit' a wholly unconnected libretto.

It received its first performance on 16 January 1935 at La Scala, Milan, which was conducted by Mascagni himself.

Roles

References

External links

Italian-language operas
Operas by Pietro Mascagni
Operas
1935 operas
Depictions of Nero in opera
Opera world premieres at La Scala
Operas set in Italy
Operas based on plays